Karabakh Committee was a group of Armenian intellectuals recognized by many Armenians as the de facto leaders in the late 1980s. The Committee was formed in 1988, with the stated objective of reunification of Nagorno-Karabakh with Armenia. The committee was arrested by Soviet authorities on 11 December 1988 on charges of obstructing humanitarian aid from Azerbaijan after the December 7 1988 Armenian earthquake, but were released on 31 May 1989, subsequently forming the Pan-Armenian National Movement. In 1990 The New York Times described the committee as "the most influential nationalist group in Armenia."

Members
Levon Ter-Petrosyan 
Vazgen Manukyan
Babken Ararktsyan
Ashot Manucharyan
Vano Siradeghyan
Rafael Ghazaryan
Samson Ghazaryan
Hambartsum Galstyan
Aleksan Hakobyan
Davit Vardanyan
Samvel Gevorgyan

References

Further reading
 
 

 
Armenian nationalism
First Nagorno-Karabakh War
Political organizations based in Armenia
1988 establishments in Armenia